Mohd Syazwan bin Zainon (Wan Kapet) (born 13 November 1989) is a Malaysian professional footballer  who plays for Malaysia Super League side Kelantan United.

Early life
Born and raised in Utan Aji, Kangar in state of northern Malaysia Perlis, Syazwan got his early education at Sekolah Menengah Kebangsaan Syed Alwi in Kayang, Perlis. Syazwan later moved to Bukit Jalil Sports School in Kuala Lumpur to further his studies.

Club career
Syazwan signed one-year deal with Felda United in 2010 moves from Perlis. In December 2011, Syazwan signed with Johor FC to play in 2012 Malaysia Super League.

Kedah
In April 2013 it was announced that Syazwan would be joining Kedah on loan after not getting a spot in the Felda United first eleven. Syazwan later permanently joined Kedah for 2014 season. Syazwan made his competitive debut for Kedah in a 4–1 win over Perlis on 24 January 2017. He scored a goal in that match and total 4 goals in 2014 Malaysia Premier League season. He helped his club to win the 2015 Malaysia Premier League and has been promoted to the 2016 Malaysia Super League.

On 20 May 2017, in Malaysia FA Cup final, Syazwan made an assist for Ken Ilsø opening goal of Kedah. The match ended Kedah won 3–2 and Syazwan has helped his team win the second trophy this season after winning the Sultan Haji Ahmad Shah Cup earlier this season.

Selangor

On 7 November 2018, Syazwan announced that a transfer agreement had been reached with Selangor, allowing him to join the Red Giants side for the 2019 season. Financial details of the deal were not immediately available, but the transfer was for an undisclosed fee.

International career
In September 2016, Syazwan received his first national team call-up for the international friendlies against Singapore and Afghanistan. He made his debut for Malaysia against Afghanistan on 11 October 2016,  before he being substitute to Hadin Azman in the 19th minute.

International goals
Scores and results list Malaysia's goal tally first.

Career statistics

Club

International

Honours
Kedah Darul Aman
 Malaysia Premier League:  2015
 Malaysia Cup: 2016
 Malaysia Charity Shield: 2017, runner-up 2018
 Malaysia FA Cup: 2017

References

External links
 
 

1989 births
Malaysian people of Malay descent
Malaysian footballers
Perlis FA players
Kedah Darul Aman F.C. players
Johor Darul Ta'zim F.C. players
Felda United F.C. players
Selangor FA players
Kelantan United F.C. players
Malaysia Super League players
Malaysia international footballers
People from Perlis
Living people
Association football wingers